Glenford is a locality in Alberta, Canada.

The community derives its name partly from the last name of Thomas Rutherford, an early postmaster, and for a glen near the site.

Hometown of the father of actor Glenn Ford, who chose Glenn as his stage name based on the name of this town.

References 

Localities in Lac Ste. Anne County